The GLAAD Davidson/Valenti Award is a special GLAAD Media Award presented annually by the Gay & Lesbian Alliance Against Defamation at the GLAAD Media Awards ceremony held in San Francisco. It is named in memory of Craig Davidson, GLAAD's first executive director, and his partner Michael Valentini, a GLAAD supporter. It is presented to an openly LGBT individual who has made a significant difference in promoting equal rights for the LGBT community.

List of recipients
 2000 - Kathy Levinson
 2001 - Rob Epstein & Jeffrey Friedman
 2002 - Sandra Bernhard
 2003 - BD Wong
 2004 - Clive Barker
 2005 - Alec Mapa
 2006 - Ron Cowen and Daniel Lipman
 2007 - Robert Gant
 2008 - Ilene Chaiken
 2009 - Chad Allen
 2010 - Lee Daniels
 2013 - Adam Lambert
 2015 - Tyler Oakley
 2016 - Hannah Hart
2017 - Don Lemon
2018 - Ross Matthews
2019 - Dan Levy

References

External links
  - GLAAD Media Awards

Davidson Valentini Award